Juan Manuel López (born 16 September 1983) is an Argentine politician, currently serving as National Deputy since 2017. A member of the Civic Coalition ARI, López was first elected in 2017 in the Federal Capital, and re-elected in 2021 in Buenos Aires Province. He presides the Civic Coalition ARI parliamentary bloc within the Juntos por el Cambio group in the Chamber of Deputies.

Early life and career
López was born on 16 September 1983 in Saladillo, a small town in central Buenos Aires Province. He finished high school at the Escuela Agrotécnica Selesiana Carlos M. Cásares in 2001, and then studied law at the University of Buenos Aires, graduating in 2008.

He served as a congressional advisor to Elisa Carrió, the founder and leader of the Civic Coalition ARI.

Political career
López ran for a seat in the Argentine Chamber of Deputies in the 2017 legislative election; he was the fourth candidate in the Vamos Juntos list in the City of Buenos Aires. The list was the most voted, with 50.93% of the votes, and López was elected. Upon the resignation of Elisa Carrió from the Chamber of Deputies in 2019, López became president of the Civic Coalition bloc.

As a national deputy, López formed part of the parliamentary commissions on Political Trials (of which he was appointed vice-president), Constitutional Affairs, Energy and Fuels, and Justice. He was a supporter of the 2020 Voluntary Interruption of Pregnancy bill, which legalized abortion in Argentina. He was the only member of the Civic Coalition to vote in favour of the bill.

In June 2021, he tested positive for COVID-19.

Ahead of the 2021 primary election, López was confirmed as one of the candidates in the "Es Juntos" list in Buenos Aires Province.

References

External links
Profile on the official website of the Chamber of Deputies (in Spanish)

Living people
1983 births
People from Buenos Aires Province
21st-century Argentine lawyers
Members of the Argentine Chamber of Deputies elected in Buenos Aires
Members of the Argentine Chamber of Deputies elected in Buenos Aires Province
Civic Coalition ARI politicians
University of Buenos Aires alumni
21st-century Argentine politicians